Maonan may refer to:

Maonan people, ethnic group in China
Maonan language, spoken by Maonan people
Maonan District, in Maoming, Guangdong, China